Hallahan is a surname. Notable people with the surname include:

Bill Hallahan (1902–1981), American left-handed pitcher in Major League Baseball
Cathriona Hallahan (born 1964/1965), Irish business executive and the managing director of Microsoft Ireland
Charles Hallahan (1943–1997), American actor
Jim Hallahan Jr. (1911–1994), Australian rules footballer, played for the Footscray and the Fitzroy Football Club
Jim Hallahan Sr. (1878–1964), Australian rules footballer, played for the St Kilda Football Club
Kay Hallahan (born 1941), former deputy leader of the Western Australian branch of the Australian Labor Party
Margaret Hallahan (born 1803), English Catholic nun, foundress of the Dominican Congregation of St. Catherine of Siena
Mike Hallahan (born 1949), Australian rules footballer, played for the Fitzroy Football Club
Mitch Hallahan (born 1992), Australian rules footballer, played for the Hawthorn and the Gold Coast Football Club
William H. Hallahan (1925–2018), American Edgar-award-winning novelist
Tom Hallahan (1908–1997), Australian rules footballer, played for the Collingwood and St Kilda Football Club

See also
J. W. Hallahan Catholic Girls High School, Roman Catholic high school in Philadelphia, Pennsylvania, USA